Jack Hickey may refer to:

 Jack Hickey (rugby) (1887–1950), Australian rugby footballer
 Jack Hickey (Australian rules footballer) (born 1930)
 Jack Hickey (baseball) (1881–1941), Major League Baseball pitcher

See also
John Hickey (disambiguation)